Frédéric d'Erlanger may refer to:

Frédéric Emile d'Erlanger (1832–1911), French banker from Germany
Frédéric Alfred d'Erlanger (1868–1943), his son, English banker from France who was also a composer